The National Motor Vehicle Company was an American manufacturer of automobiles in Indianapolis, Indiana, between 1900 and 1924. One of its presidents, Arthur C. Newby, was also one of the investors who created the Indianapolis Motor Speedway.

The company first concentrated on electric vehicles but soon began producing gasoline-engined cars. National produced a range of four, six, and twelve-cylinder passenger vehicles, as well as numerous successful racing cars. In 1923, National was merged into Associated Motor Industries, which subsequently went out of business in 1924.

History

Production models
National's first vehicle was the tiller-steered electric runabout Style A in 1900. The single electric motor was situated at the rear of the car, producing 9 hp (6.7 kW). A 4-speed herring bone transmission was fitted. The reinforced wood-framed car could reach 15 mph (24 km/h). In 1903, the company began producing internal combustion-engined cars with four-cylinder engines made by Rutenber. Electric cars were dropped from production in 1905.

For 1905, a circular radiator became a styling signature of the National brand. National introduced one of the first six-cylinder engines in the 1906 model range, which remained available until the breakup of the company.

Peak production for National was reached in 1915, with over 1,800 cars produced. For 1916, the company introduced the Highway Twelve, a 12-cylinder engine of the company's own design  (costing over $1,900) and changed its name to National Motor and Vehicle Corporation. Curiously, the 6-cylinder engine option was priced higher than the 12-cylinder, perhaps because National outsourced the 6-cylinder to Continental under the "Continental Red Seal" moniker.

Forced to raise their asking prices to counteract the effects of wartime inflation, National ended up in a higher price range in which they could not compete. For 1920, National dropped their Highway Sixes and Twelves and issued a new model – the Sextet. The Sextet used a Continental side-valve six-cylinder, modified by National engineers with an overhead valve head.

Merger
The company was merged to form Associated Motor Industries in 1922 along with Dixie Flyer and Jackson. Associated was renamed the National Motors Corporation in 1923, and few cars were made until the company ceased production in 1924.

Sporting success
National had the most enviable and successful career of all of the American pre-World War I race cars. For instance, in 1911, in a combination of road races, speedway races, hill climbs and dirt track races, they won a total of 84 times, came in second 48 times and third 30 times.

The Elgin National Trophy race as well as the Illinois Trophy was won by a National 6-cylinder in 1911. In 1912, Joe Dawson won the Indianapolis 500 in a National with an average speed of 78.7 mph. This was the first and only time a stock car ever won the Indianapolis 500.

Advertisements

References

Sources
 Frank Leslie's Popular Monthly (January, 1904)
 Clymer, Floyd. Treasury of Early American Automobiles, 1877-1925. New York: Bonanza Books, 1950.

See also
List of automobile manufacturers
List of defunct automobile manufacturers

Battery electric vehicle manufacturers
Motor vehicle manufacturers based in Indiana
Defunct motor vehicle manufacturers of the United States
Manufacturing companies based in Indianapolis
Defunct companies based in Indianapolis
Chrysler
Brass Era vehicles
Veteran vehicles
Vintage vehicles
American companies established in 1900
Vehicle manufacturing companies established in 1900
Vehicle manufacturing companies disestablished in 1923
1900 establishments in Indiana
1923 disestablishments in Indiana
1923 mergers and acquisitions
Electric vehicle manufacturers of the United States
1900s cars
1910s cars
1920s cars
Cars introduced in 1900